AFZ may refer to:

 Air Force of Zimbabwe
 Ajman Free Zone, United Arab Emirates
 Aras Free Zone, Iran
 AFZ
 Atacama Fault Zone
 Obokuitai language
 Sabzevar Airport, an airport in Sabzevar, Iran
 Women's Antifascist Front of Yugoslavia and its branches
 Air Fighter Zone, a zone of the Air Defence of Great Britain
 SMS language meaning "acronym free zone"
 AFZ: an EEG electrode site according to the 10-20 system